Enders or Ender's may refer to:

Literature and film
 Ender's Game (series), a series of science fiction books by Orson Scott Card, also known as the Ender saga
 Ender's Game, a 1985 military science fiction novel
 Ender's Shadow, a 1999 parallel science fiction novel
 A War of Gifts: An Ender Story, a 2007 science fiction novel
 Ender in Exile, a 2008 science fiction novel
 Ender's Game (film), a 2013 American science fiction action film based on the novel

Places
 Enders, Nebraska, US
 Enders, Pennsylvania, US
 Enders Island, Connecticut, US

People
 Arthur Enders (born 1982), also known as "Ace" Enders, former lead singer and guitarist of the defunct band The Early November
 Courtney Enders (born 1986), drag racer
 Dieter Enders (born 1946), organic chemist who has made contributions to the field of asymmetric synthesis
 Erica Enders (born 1983), champion drag racer
 John Franklin Enders (1897–1985), Nobel laureate who helped develop the polio vaccine
 Peter Enders (chess player) (born 1963), German chess master
 Thomas O. Enders (1932–1996), former US diplomat

Other uses
 Enders (automobile), a French automobile manufactured from 1911 until 1923
 EastEnders (nickname), a British soap opera

See also

 Enders's small-eared shrew, a mammal endemic to Panama
 
 
 
 Ender (disambiguation)
 End (disambiguation)

Surnames from given names